Ramanathan Ramkumar (born 8 November 1994) is an Indian professional tennis player. He has been ranked as high as No. 111 in singles by the Association of Tennis Professionals (ATP), which he achieved in July 2018, and in doubles at No. 58 achieved in August 2022. He has represented India in the Davis Cup. In 2018, he became the first Indian player to reach an ATP Tour singles final since Somdev Devvarman in 2011.

Personal and early life 
Ramanathan started playing tennis at the age of five. He was introduced to the sport by his father Ramanathan. His mother's name is Alagammai and sister's name is Uma. Both his parents are into the textile business. He speaks English, Spanish and Tamil. He trains at Sanchez-Casal Academy in Barcelona, Spain. He is currently pursuing B.A. in Economics at Loyola College.

Career

2008–2010: Junior Career and Turning Pro 
Ramanathan began playing tennis at the age of five, turning professional in 2009.

2014–2016: Early career 
In 2014, Ramanathan qualified for the main draw of the Chennai Open and beat the then-Indian No. 1 Somdev Devvarman in the first round. He then lost to Marcel Granollers in the second round.

In 2015, Ramanathan played mostly on Futures and Challenger level. He entered the Chennai Open, where he lost in first round to Tatsuma Ito in straight sets. In April, he reached his first doubles final at a challenger event at the Mersin Cup in Turkey. Partnering with Riccardo Ghedin, the pair lost the final to Mate Pavić and Michael Venus. He entered his second ATP world tour event of the year at Malaysian Open where he lost in the first round to Mikhail Kukushkin.

In the 2016 season, Ramanathan entered the Chennai Open and reached the quarterfinals, his best result at an ATP World Tour event. He defeated Daniel Gimeno Traver and Alexander Kudryavtsev in the first and second rounds respectively. He lost to Aljaž Bedene in the quarterfinals. In October, Ramanathan partnered with Jeevan Nedunchezhiyan. The pair reached the final at the Vietnam Open Challenger, where they lost to Sanchai Ratiwatana and Sonchat Ratiwatana.

2017: Challenger breakthrough, first ATP top-10 win 
In April, Ramanathan reached his first singles challenger final at the Tallahassee challenger. He lost to Blaž Rola.

Ramanathan entered the 2017 Antalya Open, where he upset world No. 8 and top seed Dominic Thiem in the second round. This was his first match against a top-10 player. Ranked world No. 222, Ramanathan defeated Thiem in straight sets, 6–3, 6–2. He progressed to the quarterfinals, where he lost to Marcos Baghdatis.

In July, he reached his second singles challenger final at Nielsen Pro Tennis Championships. He lost in straight sets to Akira Santillan.

In August, Ramanathan qualified for the first time in main draw of a Masters 1000 tournament at Cincinnati Masters. He defeated Christopher Eubanks in first round, but lost to Jared Donaldson in second round. Ramanathan entered qualifying draw of US Open. He defeated Paul-Henri Mathieu in first round but lost to Nicolas Mahut in second round. He finished year with singles ranking of 148.

2018: Hall of Fame Tennis Championships finalist
Ramanathan opened his new season by entering Maharashtra Open as a wild card. He lost in round 2 to top seed Marin Cilic in straight sets. He then entered qualifying draw of Australian Open where he lost in final qualifying round to Vasek Pospisil.

In April, Ramanathan reached his first challenger singles final of the season at Taipei Challenger. He was defeated in the finals by compatriot Yuki Bhambri.

In July, Ramanathan reached his first ATP final at Newport, where he lost to Steve Johnson. He became the first Indian to reach an ATP world tour singles final since Somdev Devvarman at the 2011 Johannesburg Open.

In November, he won his first doubles ATP Challenger title at Pune Challenger. He paired with compatriot Vijay Sundar Prashanth and defeated Hsieh Cheng-peng and Yang Tsung-hua in the final. He finished the year with singles ranking of 133.

2019–20: Singles final & four doubles titles in Challengers 
Ramanthan won the doubles titles in Japan, France, Italy, and two in India.

2021: Major debut in mixed doubles, Maiden singles Challenger title
Ramanathan entered men's singles qualifying draw of Wimbledon. He defeated Jozef Kovalík and Tomás Martín Etcheverry in the first and second rounds respectively in straight sets but lost to Marc Polmans in last qualifying round in a five sets thriller in the tiebreaker. He made his Grand Slam main draw debut in mixed doubles where he entered the draw after a last minute withdrawal partnering Ankita Raina. This was a Grand Slam mixed doubles debut for both players. They lost to compatriots Rohan Bopanna and Sania Mirza in straight sets. It was a historic first ever all Indian match at a Grand Slam level. 

He won his first singles Challenger title at Manama Challenger where he defeated Evgeny Karlovskiy in straight  sets. Ramanathan ended 2021 year by reaching the quarterfinals of the 2021 Antalya Challenger III in singles and the semifinals of doubles with Vladyslav Orlov.

2022: First ATP Tour title & Top 100 debut in doubles
Ramkumar had good start to 2022 season with a title win in Adelaide, Ramanathan partnered with Rohan Bopanna and won the title by defeating top seeds Ivan Dodig and Marcelo Melo in the final. This was his first ATP Tour title. Just a month later he won his second ATP title with Rohan Bopanna at Maharastra Open by defeating Australian pair of Luke Saville and John-Patrick Smith in the final. Following his title victory he broke into ATP Top 100 doubles rankings by reaching career best ranking of World No. 94. Whereas he lost to Holger Rune in Adelaide qualifiers and Gian Marco Moroni in Australian Open qualifiers in straight sets respectively. He had also lost to Stefano Travaglia in Maharashtra first round in three sets.

Ramanathan lost in the first round of 2022 Bengaluru Open to Max Purcell in three sets but went on to win the doubles title with Saketh Myneni seeded no.3 defeating French pair of Hugo Grenier and Alexandre Müller in straight sets in the final. The pair didn't drop a single set in winning the title. He then lost to Mathias Bourgue at Bengaluru Open 2 but reached the doubles final with Saketh Myneni again losing to Arjun Kadhe and Alexander Erler in the tie breaker. Ramanathan and Saketh lost in the 1st round of 2022 Dubai Tennis Championships to John Peers and Filip Polášek in straight sets after receiving a wildcard.

Ramanathan lost to Liam Broady in the qualifying round of 2022 Indian Wells Masters. Ramanathan was the top seed in the singles qualifying round of 2022 Challenger di Roseto degli Abruzzi II but lost to Francesco Maestrelli. He reached the quarterfinals of the doubles event with Jeevan Nedunchezhiyan. He then reached the final of the Challenger Biel/Bienne with Purav Raja where they lost to top seeds Pierre-Hugues Herbert and Albano Olivetti in straight sets. He then lost to JC Aragone in the first round of Salinas Challenger. As the top seeds with Jeevan in doubles, he still lost to eventual champions and compatriots Yuki Bhambri and Saketh Myneni.

ATP career finals

Singles: 1 (1 runner-up)

Doubles: 2 (2 titles)

Challenger and Futures finals

Singles: 29 (17–12)

Doubles: 43 (22–21)

Singles performance timeline

Current through the 2022 Atlanta Open.

Wins over top-10 players

References

External links

1994 births
Living people
Indian male tennis players
Racket sportspeople from Chennai
Tennis players at the 2018 Asian Games
Tamil sportspeople
Asian Games competitors for India
South Asian Games gold medalists for India
South Asian Games medalists in tennis
21st-century Indian people